Jaime Lee Kirchner (born August 23, 1981) is an American actress, dancer and singer, known for her roles on television.

Life and career
Kirchner was born in Nuremberg, Germany but was raised in Clarksville, Tennessee. She attended New York University's Tisch School of the Arts in New York. She made her stage debut in the role of Mimi Marquez in the international and Broadway productions of musical Rent in 2005. Before acting, she appeared as a dancer in Beyoncé's "Work It Out" music video.

Kirchner is best known for her performances on television. She starred opposite Don Johnson in the short-lived The WB comedy-drama, Just Legal in 2005. The series was canceled after only three episodes had been aired. She later starred as one of leads alongside Taylor Schilling and Michelle Trachtenberg in the NBC medical drama Mercy from 2009 to 2010. The series also was canceled after single season. She also guest-starred on Rescue Me, CSI: Crime Scene Investigation, and Dollhouse, and had a recurring role in the USA Network comedy-drama, Necessary Roughness. In 2012, Kirchner was regular cast member of Fox series, The Mob Doctor.

In 2014, Kirchner was cast in the ABC primetime soap opera, Members Only created by Susannah Grant, but the series never aired. In 2016, she was cast in the role of Investigator Danny James on the CBS legal drama Bull.

Filmography

References

External links
 

American film actresses
American television actresses
Living people
1981 births
American soap opera actresses
American stage actresses
Tisch School of the Arts alumni
21st-century American actresses